Legitimate defense of honor is a legal term in Brazilian jurisprudence, used by the defense to justify the defendant's acts as crimes of passion, attributing the motivating factor of the crime to the behavior of the victim. This justification has been used, among other reasons, to eliminate or reduce the culpability of a spouse or lover who has committed violence against a female partner.

References

Further reading 

 
 
 

Criminal defenses
Law of Brazil